The 1960 Indiana gubernatorial election was held on November 8, 1960. Democratic nominee Matthew E. Welsh defeated Republican nominee Crawford F. Parker with 50.39% of the vote.

General election

Candidates
Major party candidates
Matthew E. Welsh, Democratic, State Senator
Crawford F. Parker, Republican, Lieutenant Governor under Harold W. Handley

Other candidates
J. Ralston Miller, Prohibition
Herman Kronewitter, Socialist Labor

Results

References

1960
Indiana
Gubernatorial